Ingrid Lieten (born 20 April 1964, Hasselt) is a Flemish politician and former Minister for Innovation, Public Investment, Media and Poverty Reduction in the Flemish Government for the Socialist Party – Different.

She studied jurisprudence at the VUB and became a lawyer at the bar association of Brussels and Hasselt. A couple of years later, she obtained a master's degree in Industrial Location and Development.

On 1 January 2002, Lieten became CEO of De Lijn, de Flemish national bus company. She left the company in 2009. On 13 July 2009 Lieten was appointed Minister for Innovation, Public Investment, Media and Poverty Reduction in the Flemish Government by her party, the Socialist Party – Different (sp-a). Lieten was also Flemish vice-premier, together with N-VA politician Geert Bourgeois.

In February 2011, Lieten caused a stir in the Flemish Government, after she called her fellow ministers "insensitive caricatures made of Teflon and concrete" in a leaked email.

Honours 
2014: commander in the Order of Leopold.

References

External links 

Flemish politicians
Socialistische Partij Anders politicians
1964 births
Living people
People from Hasselt
Vrije Universiteit Brussel alumni
21st-century Belgian politicians
21st-century Belgian women politicians
Flemish lawyers
Belgian chief executives
Women chief executives